Ernest Sowah (born 31 March 1988, in Accra) is a Ghanaian professional footballer who plays as a goalkeeper for Great Olympics.

Club career 
Sowah, a former member of Tema Youth, was regarded as one of the most promising goalkeepers in Ghana in 2007 and 2008.

International career 
Sowah made his debut for Ghana in a friendly versus China on 15 August 2012. He played for the Ghana national team at the 2012 Africa Cup of Nations.

Honours

Club 
Berekum Chelsea

 Ghana Premier League: 2010–11

Asante Kotoko

 Ghanaian FA Cup: 2017

International 
Ghana

 Africa Cup of Nations runner-up:2015

References

External links

1988 births
Living people
Ghanaian footballers
Ghana international footballers
Association football goalkeepers
Footballers from Accra
Ghanaian expatriate footballers
Tema Youth players
Berekum Chelsea F.C. players
CS Don Bosco players
Asante Kotoko S.C. players
Accra Hearts of Oak S.C. players
Accra Great Olympics F.C. players
Expatriate footballers in the Democratic Republic of the Congo
2012 Africa Cup of Nations players
2015 Africa Cup of Nations players